Seton School is an accredited, private, co-educational Catholic junior & senior high school located in Manassas, Virginia founded in 1973 by Anne Carroll, wife of Dr. Warren Carroll. According to its website, Seton teaches orthodox, traditional Catholicism in harmony with the Magisterium of the Catholic Church and its leader, Pope Francis. Its mission statement emphasizes Catholicism in the classroom as well as the importance of discipline. It was awarded a place on the Cardinal Newman Society's Catholic High School Honor Roll in 2012, and again in 2014

About the school 
The school has evolved considerably since its founding as the Christian Commonwealth School by Anne Carroll in 1973.  In 1975, Mrs. Carroll moved the school from Warrenton to Manassas, Virginia and renamed it after St. Elizabeth Ann Seton, who was canonized the same year.  In 1982, the Seton Home Study program was founded to complement the School.  This program eventually separated and became its own entity, known as the Seton Home Study School.  The enrollment of Seton High School passed the hundred mark in 1989.  The school completed a purchase of church buildings in 1980 at the present location of the campus,  allowing the school to continue its growth process.  Further expansions have included the dedication of the St. Joseph's wing in 1992, the John Paul II Center which was opened in 1994 and houses the school gym, the Our Lady of the Rosary wing in 1995, and finally the Corpus Christi Center in 2006. Following the 2006 expansion, the junior high part of the school was moved into the Corpus Christi Center. Currently the school has reached its capacity enrollment of approximately 350.

Seton School requires its students to complete a rigorous course of studies designed to prepare its students to succeed in challenging college coursework. Included in this curriculum are several college level courses that, while not official AP courses, consistently enable
the students to score 3 or higher on AP exams in the subject areas of Calculus, Economics, English Language, English Literature, Physics, Statistics, and United States Government. For 2010 through 2012 scores of 3 or greater were obtained on 67% of all AP exams taken.

Due to its commitment to Catholic identity, Seton School was awarded a spot on Cardinal Newman Society's Catholic High School Honor Roll in 2012. According to the Society, this list of 50 Catholic high schools in the United States honors schools that have "overall excellence in Catholic identity, academics and civics education". Seton High School was one of three schools in Virginia to receive this honor. The other two schools were Pope Paul VI High School in Fairfax and Pope John Paul the Great Catholic High School in Dumfries. It was placed on the list again in 2014. Four other Virginia schools received this honor: Paul VI Catholic High School, Pope John Paul the Great Catholic High School, Holy Family Academy and Bishop O'Connell High School.

In 2012, a teacher was charged with attempted indecent liberties with a 15-year-old male student.

Sports accolades 
Boys Baseball: VIS Div II Quarterfinalist 2008, 2009
Boys Basketball: VIS Div. II Quarterfinalist 2010
Girls Basketball: VIS Div. II State Champs 2003–2004; Quarterfinalist 2007–2008, 2008–2009; Semifinalist 2016; Runner-Up 2017
Boys Lacrosse: VIS Div. II State Champs 2007; Semifinalist 2008, 2009, 2011; Quarterfinalist 2010
Boys Soccer: VIS Div. II State Champs 2004, 2005, 2006; Semifinalist 2007; Runner-Up 2008, 2012
Girls Soccer: VIS Div. II Semifinalist 2006, 2009, 2016; Quarterfinalist 2010, 2011, 2013–2015; State Champs 2017
Boys Swimming: VIS Div. II State Champs 2005–2006, 2008–2011; Runner-Up 2006–2007, 2007–2008
Girls Swimming: VIS Div. II State Champs 2007–2011; Runner-Up 2005–2006, 2012, 2015
Boys Tennis: VIS Div. II Semifinalist 2009–2010
Girls Volleyball: VIS Div. II Semifinalist 2008; Quarterfinalist 2007, 2010
Girls Softball: VIS Div. II Quarterfinalist 2011

Student awards and honors

References

Buildings and structures in Manassas, Virginia
Catholic secondary schools in Virginia
Educational institutions established in 1975
1975 establishments in Virginia